The Taroii Open de Tênis is a tennis tournament held in Itajaí, Brazil since 2013. The event is part of the ATP Challenger Tour and is played on clay courts.

Past finals

Singles

Doubles

References

External links
Official website

 
ATP Challenger Tour
Clay court tennis tournaments
Tennis tournaments in Brazil